Boyracer (sometimes styled Boyracer UK) is a British punk band from Leeds, England.

History
Boyracer was founded by vocalist/guitarist Stewart Anderson in 1990 and released their first single in 1991. Richard Adams left the group in 1993, after which the group released its first EP, Naked. They then arranged to release further recordings via Sarah Records including two more EPs in 1993. Both James Chadwick and Simon Guild departed early in 1994, and Anderson put together a new line-up before releasing the group's debut full-length for Slumberland Records.

More lineup changes ensued in 1994 while the group continued to put out releases, with a number of 7 inch EPs and they toured the United States for the first time at the beginning of 1995. Later that year they signed with MCA subsidiary label Zero Hour Records. The label dropped them while they were doing a nationwide U.S. tour. They then released several singles on independent American labels over the course of 1996. Early in 1997, the group split up, but in 2000 Anderson reconstituted Boyracer with several new members and new material.

In 2010 the band played two shows in Los Angeles and San Francisco as part of the Slumberland Records 20th Anniversary showcase. The group played another show in Flagstaff, Arizona at the end of October 2011. Following a short hiatus, Boyracer hit the road again, touring the United States and playing beloved small venues. Anderson's label, Emotional Response Records, collaborated with Slumberland Records to launch the hugely successful Oakland Weekender festival in 2022.

Members
Stewart Anderson - vocals, bass, guitar, drums (1989–present)
Laura Bridge (1989-1991, 2020)
Richard Adams - bass (1990–1993)
Simon Guild - guitar (1990–present)
James Chadwick - drums (1990–1994)
Stewart Turner - guitar (1992-1993)
Matty Green (1994–1997, 2000-present)
Nicola Hodgkinson - bass (1994–1997)
Kevin Paver - drums (1994)
Ged McGurn - drums (1994–1997)
Jen Turrell - bass (2000–2018)
Frank Jordan - drums (2000–2002)
Ara Hacopian - drums/guitar/keyboard (2001–2020)
Christina Riley - guitar/vocals (2019–present)

Discography

LPs
Louisville - Leeds - TKO! (A Turntable Friend – TURN 18 1993 split with Hula Hoop)
More Songs About Frustration and Self-Hate (Slumberland Records, 1994)
Boyracer in Full Colour (Zero Hour Records – ZH 1140 1996)
To Get a Better Hold You've Got To Loosen Your Grip (555 Recordings, 2002)
Girlracer  (555 Recordings, 2003) split with Kanda
Happenstancer (Happy Happy Birthday To Me Records – HHBTM063 2004)
Absence Makes the Heart Grow Harder (Foxyboy – foxy008 2004)
A Punch Up The Bracket 555 Recordings – 555CD72 2006
Boyracer Jukebox Vol 1 (555 Recordings, 2007)
Flickering B+W (555 Recordings, 2007)
Sunlight is the Best Antiseptic (555 Recordings, 2008)
Fling Yr Bonnet Over the Windmill (Emotional Response Records, 2020)
On a Promise (Emotional Response Records, 2020)
Assuaged (Emotional Response Records, 2021)

Singles
Boyracer / The Ropers – Tour Split I Wish I Was A Slumberland Record – WISH 005 1994
Hula Hoop / Boyracer (7 Fluff (2) – danny 9 1992)
Railway (7 Fluff (2) – honey 2 1992
Naked (7 A Turntable Friend – TURN 14 1992
Boyracer / Sabine (7 Wurlitzer Jukebox – WJ01, Flower Me! Records – none 1993 split Sabine
West Riding House (Zero Hour – ZERO HOUR 1 1995
Electricity (A Turntable Friend – TURN 23F 1995
A Mistake That Cost You Dearly (Honey Bear Records – HB014 1996
One Side Of Boyracer  Slumberland Records – SLR 49 1996
Boyracer / My Favorite – False Economy / Modulate  A Turntable Friend – TURN 28 1996
Rhythm Of The Chicken Shake Jigsaw – PZL003 1996
Present Tense Happy Go Lucky – HAPPY11, 555 Recordings – 55505 1997
Don't Want Anything To Change 555 Recordings – 55535 2002
Boyracer / Dr. König Arthus Open Records (3) – Open 012 2005
Happy Happy Birthday To Me 2007 Singles Club #4  Happy Happy Birthday To Me Records – HHBTM 095 - SC4 2007 split Faintest Ideas
Boyracer / Beatnik Filmstars split  555 Recordings – 55545 2007
Boyracer / Mytty Archer – Boyracer / Mytty Archer 555 Recordings – 55544, Brittle Records – BR-04 2007
Boyracer / Possum Moods / Hulaboy – Boyracer / Possum Moods / Hulaboy 2007 555 Recordings – 55543
The Cannanes / Mytty Archer / Boyracer – The Cannanes / Mytty Archer / Boyracer 2008 555 Recordings – 55548, Jellyfant – 7jf05
Que Possum / Boyracer – Que Possum / Boyracer 2008 555 Recordings – 55547
The How / Boyracer – The How / Boyracer 555 Recordings – 55551, I Wish I Was A Slumberland Record – wish013 2010
American Culture / Boyracer – American Culture / Boyracer  Emotional Response (2) – ER-11 2014
Boyracer / Huon – Bonus Disc! 555 Recordings – 555CD86 2008 split Huon
Bored and Lonely - Boyracer (Emotional Response Records 2019)

EPs
Best Flipstar EP (Lo-Fi Recordings (2) – low 3 1994)
Pure Hatred 96 EP Sarah Records – SARAH 96 1994)
285 Clock Cake (Hedonist Productions – CAKE 001F 1993
Go Flexi Crazy (Pure Hatred – Pure Hatred One & Two 1993
From Purity to Purgatory EP (Sarah Records – SARAH 85, 1993)
B Is for Boyracer EP (Sarah Records, Sarah Records – SARAH 76 CD 1993)
(1994 ep) AUL 36X EP Slumberland Records – SLR 035 1994
We Are Made of the Same Wood (Slumberland Records, A Turntable Friend – TURN 24, Slumberland Records – SLR 048 1995)
Pain, Plunder and Personal Loss (Happy Go Lucky – HAPPY05 1995)
Racer 100 EP (Blackbean And Placenta Tape Club – BBPTC 020 1996
Check Yr F**king Hi$tory EP (555 Recordings – 555CD68 555 Recordings, 2003) 
Boyracer – We Have Such Gifts EP 555 Recordings – 55537 2004
Fool Around with Boyracer 12" EP (Parapop Recordings, 2004)
Yorkshire Soul Yellow Mica Recordings – YMR 010 2004
It's Not True Grit, It's Real Dirt 555 Recordings – 55542 2005
Insults and Insights EP (Kittridge Records – KITT-018 Kittridge Records, 2005) 
Winners Losers, Cuts and Bruises EP (555 Recordings – 555LP69, 555 Recordings, 2005) 
I Know What Boys Like EP freakScene. – scene 006 2014
 First String Teenage High: The Songs of Tullycraft Played By People Who Aren't (Compilation; AAJ/BumbleBear Records, 2003)
Happenstancer EP (Happy Happy Birthday to Me Records, 2004)

Lives and compilations
Acoustically Yours (555 Recordings, 2003)
Live At Staches, Columbus Ohio Blackbean And Placenta Tape Club – BBPTC 084 1997
Live On WAMH Rocket Racer – RR001 1997
Punker Than You Since '92 (555 Recordings, 2006)
B-sides and Besides (555 Recordings, 2002)
A Punch Up the Bracket (555 Recordings, 2005)
Punker Than You Since '92 (555 Recordings, 2006)

References

External links
IndiePages.com
Myspace.com

Zero Hour Records artists
Indie rock groups from Leeds
Slumberland Records artists